Gilla Dubh Ó Flaithbheartaigh (died 1442) was Lord of Iar Connacht and Chief of the Name.

Overview

Gilla Dubh was one of the first of the family to feature in the annals in over a hundred years. Even so, it was not until the middle of the 16th century that the family gained sufficient prominence to become regularly worthy of note in Gaelic annals. 

He was brother to the previous lord, Murchad mac Brian Ó Flaithbheartaigh. His term is obscure; all that is recorded from his era is the following:

1439. Owen O'Flaherty was treacherously slain in his own bed at night, by a farmer of his own people.

See also

 Ó Flaithbertaigh

References

 West or H-Iar Connaught Ruaidhrí Ó Flaithbheartaigh, 1684 (published 1846, ed. James Hardiman).
 Origin of the Surname O'Flaherty, Anthony Matthews, Dublin, 1968, p. 40.
 CELT: Corpus of Electronic Texts at University College Cork

People from County Galway
Medieval Gaels from Ireland
1442 deaths
Gilla
Year of birth unknown
Irish lords